Sir Mirza Ismail Nagara, commonly known as Richmond Town is a neighbourhood located in the central part of the city of Bangalore. A part of the Bangalore Cantonment area, Richmond Town was established during the British rule in 1883. During the period, the area mainly consisted of Anglo Indians, Arcot Mudaliars, Parsis, Muslim traders from Persia and British residents. Like Benson Town, Cleveland Town and Langford Town, this area was known for its colonial design.

In recent years, the locality has seen modernization and increase in real estate demand. Important landmarks in Richmond Town include Richmond Park and Johnson Market.

References

External links

Neighbourhoods in Bangalore